Michael Sanderson (born 26 October 1966) is a former football midfielder who played in the Football League for Darlington on a non-contract basis. He began his career as a trainee with Hartlepool United, and also played non-league football for Billingham Town and Guisborough Town.

Sanderson made his Darlington debut on 3 March 1985, standing in for regular left back Peter Johnson in a 7–0 defeat of Halifax Town in the Associate Members' Cup. He played once in the Third Division, replacing Steve Tupling for the visit to Notts County on 6 May 1986; Darlington lost 5–0.

References

1966 births
Living people
English footballers
Association football midfielders
Hartlepool United F.C. players
Darlington F.C. players
Guisborough Town F.C. players
Billingham Town F.C. players
English Football League players